Last Stand in the Philippines is a 1945 Spanish biographical war film directed by Antonio Román. It is based on a radio script by Enrique Llovet, Los Héroes de Baler, and novel, El Fuerte de Baler, by Enrique Alfonso Barcones and Rafael Sánchez Campoy.

The movie theme song "", composed by Llovet (lyrics) and Jorge Halpern (music), became very popular. It was lip synced by actress Nani Fernández and sang by Maria Teresa Valcárcel.

Historical facts

"The Last Ones of the Philippines" is the name given to the Spanish soldiers who fought in the Siege of Baler against Filipino revolutionaries and against the US Army during the Spanish–American War (in Spain also called "The Disaster of 98").

The siege of Baler lasted from 1 July 1898 to 2 June 1899. During these 11 months, the Spaniards were isolated in a church that became their fortified position. The Spanish troops were a small garrison of 50 soldiers from the "2º de Cazadores" under the charge of Lieutenant D. Juan Alonso Zayas. They faced approximately 800 rebel soldiers. The Spanish soldiers fortified the church and resisted the constant attacks of the rebels for 11 months without provisions and unknowing that the war had ended in December 1898.

Cast
Armando Calvo as Teniente Martín Cerezo
José Nieto as Capitán Enrique de las Morenas
Guillermo Marín as Doctor Rogelio Vigil
Manolo Morán as Pedro Vila
Juan Calvo as Cabo Olivares
Fernando Rey as Juan Chamizo
Manuel Kayser as Fray Cándido
Carlos Muñoz as Santamaría
José Miguel Rupert as Moisés
Pablo Álvarez Rubio as Herrero, el desertor
Nani Fernández as Tala
Emilio Ruiz de Córdoba as El Correo
César Guzmán as Jesús García Quijano
Alfonso de Horna as Marquiado
Manuel Arbó as Gómez Ortiz
Tony Leblanc as military courier, in his first role with dialogue in a film

See also
Baler - A 2008 Philippine film.
1898, Our Last Men in the Philippines - A 2016 Spanish film.

References

External links
 

Los últimos de Filipinas Website (in English and Spanish)

1945 films
1940s historical films
Spanish historical films
1940s Spanish-language films
Spanish biographical films
Spanish black-and-white films
Spanish–American War films
Films set during the Philippine–American War
Films set in the Philippines
Films shot in the Philippines
Philippine war films
Siege films
1940s biographical films
1940s war films
1940s Spanish films